Pravda Records is an American independent record label based in Chicago, Illinois, United States, representing a diverse roster of indie rock, soul, pop, and experimental artists.

History
Pravda Records was founded by Kenn Goodman in 1984.  Pravda's first release was a five song cassette by The Service entitled Foma. In 1986,  Pravda Records opened a retail store at 3730 N. Clark Street in the storefront of Metro Chicago.  Until 1992, the retail store focused on imports and other independent music. Goodman closed the retail store to shift emphasis back to the label and its artists. To date, Pravda Records has over 100 releases in a variety of genres from artists such as Grammy Award-nominated Susan Voelz, Glenn Mercer of The Feelies, and late Motown legend Andre Williams.

In 1993, Goodman started a subsidiary label Bughouse Records focusing on outsider artists performing live in Chicago. Artists on Bughouse include, Tiny Tim, Legendary Stardust Cowboy, Cordell Jackson, and Hasil Adkins.

In 2010, Pravda celebrated 25 years of indie rock with a special performance at the Abbey Pub on January 22, 2010.  The Service, who penned Pravda's first release, headlined supported by The Slugs and Boom Hank.

In 2022, Pravda celebrated 38 years at Sketchbook Brewery in Skokie, Illinois.

Artist roster
Andre Williams
Black Smokers
Boom Hank
Cheer-Accident
The Civil Tones
Claude Pate
The Diplomats of Solid Sound
Glenn Mercer
The Goldstars
Green
The Imperial Sound
Javelin Boot
Lab Partners
Lost Cause
The Melismatics
New Duncan Imperials
Precious Wax Drippings
The Ruiners
Ryan and Pony
The Service
The Slugs
Susan Voelz
Wake Ooloo
Young Fresh Fellows (The band is shown performing on the sidewalk in front of the Pravda Records storefront on the cover of their “Refreshments” EP. They also later released the “Two Guitars, Bass and Drums” 7-inch on Pravda)

References

External links
Official website
Srticles.chicagotribune.com
Blogs.suntimes.com
Chicagobusiness.com

Record labels established in 1984
1984 establishments in Illinois
American record labels